Sean Finn may refer to:

 Sean Finn (DJ), German DJ from Stuttgart
 Sean Finn (footballer) (born 1978), retired Irish association football defender
 Sean C. Finn (1889–1921), Irish Republican Army commander
 Sean Finn ice hockey Left Defensemen